Békés may design:

the town Békés
the Békés county
the historical comitatus Békés (former county)
the "békés", the Creole term for descendants of European colonialists (especially in the Antilles)